Hüttenbach may refer to:

Places

 Hüttenbach (Grafengehaig), borough of the municipality Grafengehaig in the district of Kulmbach in Bavaria in Germany
 Hüttenbach (Simmelsdorf), borough of the Simmelsdorf in the district of Nürnberger Land in Bavaria in Germany

Waters

 Hüttenbach (Altmühl), left tributary of the Altmühl in the district of Eichstätt in Bavaria in Germany
 Hüttenbach (Haselbach), left tributary of the Haselbach at Sulzbach an der Murr in the district of Rems-Murr in Baden-Württemberg in Germany
 Hüttenbach (Pegnitz), left tributary of the Pegnitz in the district Nürnberger Land in Bavaria in Germany
 Hüttenbach (Schafbach), tributary of the Wiesensee in the district Westerwaldkreis, Rhineland-Palatinate in Germany